Académica de Coimbra may refer to:

 Associação Académica de Coimbra (Coimbra Academic Association), the students' union of the University of Coimbra that comprises several sports and cultural sections, and autonomous organizations, in Coimbra, Portugal
 Associação Académica de Coimbra – O.A.F., an autonomous professional football organization of the Associação Académica de Coimbra